Samson Gombe FAAS FTWAS (5 November 1938 – 4 February 1989) was a Kenyan professor of Biological Systems and Organisms. He was a Fellow of Third World Academy of Sciences and a Founding Fellow and Secretary of African Academy of Sciences.

Early life and education 
Gombe was born on 5 November 1938 in Seme, Kisumu, Kenya. He attended Maseno School, Makerere College between 1958 and 1960. Then educated at the University of London (1961-9167) and Cornell University (1969-1972).

Career and research 
Gombe was a lecturer at the Department of Animal Physiology, University of Nairobi from 1968 until his death on 4 February 1989, aged 50, after a short illness. Gombe was one of the founders of the African Academy of Sciences in 1985, and later became the Secretary/Scientific General (1987–1989) and Treasurer (1987–1989). He was an Honorary Assistant Treasurer of Kenya National Academy of Science.

Gombe focused more on reproductive physiology, endocrinology, malnutrition, mineral deficiencies, adverse environmental and parasitic infections that may lead to infertility.

Awards and recognitions 
Gombe was a Foundry Fellow of the African Academy of Sciences as of it inception in 1985 a Fellows of The World Academy of Sciences since 1985, and a Fellow of the Kenya National Academy of Sciences in 1986.

Selected publications 

 Gombe, Samson; Oduor-Okelo, Dominic (1991-06). Development of the foetal membranes in the cane rat (Thryonomys swinderianus): a re‐interpretation, African Journal of Ecology, Volume 29, Issue 2, pages 157–167
 Samson Gombe, William Hansel (1973-09-01). Plasma Luteinizing Hormone (LH) and Progesterone Levels in Heifers on Restricted Energy Intakes Get access Arrow. Journal of Animal Science, Volume 37, Issue 3, September 1973, Pages 728–733.
 Norman, Charles; Gombe, Samson (1975-09-01). Stimulatory effect of the lysosomal stabilizer, chloroquine, on the respiration and motility of fresh and aged bovine spermatozoa. Reproduction. 44 (3): 481–486. doi:10.1530/jrf.0.0440481. ISSN 0022-4251.
 Alila, Hector W.; Rogo, Khama O.; Gombe, Samson (1987-06-01). Effects of prolactin on steroidogenesis by human luteal cells in culture. Fertility and Sterility. 47 (6): 947–955. doi:10.1016/S0015-0282(16)59228-0. ISSN 0015-0282.

Notes

References 

Makerere University alumni
Cornell University alumni
1938 births
1989 deaths
Founder Fellows of the African Academy of Sciences
Fellows of the African Academy of Sciences
TWAS fellows